"Epic Pooh" is a 1978 essay by the British science fiction writer Michael Moorcock, which reviews the field of epic fantasy, with a particular focus on epic fantasy written for children. In it Moorcock critiques J. R. R. Tolkien's The Lord of the Rings for its politically conservative assumptions and its escapism.

Originally written for the British Science Fiction Association, "Epic Pooh" was revised for inclusion in Moorcock's 1989 book Wizardry and Wild Romance.

Summary

Moorcock criticises a group of celebrated writers of epic fantasy for children, including Tolkien, C. S. Lewis, and Richard Adams. His criticism is based on two principal grounds: what he sees as the poverty of their writing style, and a political criticism. Moorcock accuses these authors of espousing a form of "corrupted Romance", which he identifies with Anglican Toryism. The defining traits of this attitude are an anti-technological, anti-urban stance which Moorcock sees as ultimately misanthropic, that glorifies a vanishing or vanished rural idyll, and is rooted in middle-class or bourgeois attitudes towards progress and political change. 

The title arises from Moorcock's argument that the writing of Tolkien, Lewis, Adams and others has a similar purpose to the Winnie-the-Pooh writings of A. A. Milne, another author of whom he disapproves: it is fiction intended to comfort rather than challenge. 

Writer M. John Harrison, originally a member of the same British New Wave in science fiction which emerged around Moorcock's New Worlds magazine, has expressed similar views about Tolkien's fantasy as a 'literature of comfort' and about epic fantasy in general as a literature of escapism which refuses to deal with the issues raised by the real world. 

Writers whom Moorcock cites approvingly, in contrast to his treatment of Tolkien, Lewis and Adams, include Terry Pratchett, Ursula K. Le Guin and Alan Garner.

Revisions
Moorcock's most recent revisions to the piece add mention of such authors as Pratchett and Rowling and drop those whose names would be less familiar today (Moorcock also has claimed that Philip Pullman's His Dark Materials deserved credit, though the essay was written and revised before those books were published). As an example, from the original "... are successful. It is the tone of Warwick Deeping's Sorrell and Son, of John Steinbeck at his worst, or, in a more sophisticated form..." and from the revised version "... are successful. It is the tone of many forgotten British and American bestsellers, well-remembered children's books, like The Wind in the Willows, you often hear it in regional fiction addressed to a local audience, or, in a more sophisticated form..."

References

External links
Epic Pooh, Revised version. Michael Moorcock, (British Fantasy Society, 1978)

1978 essays
1989 essays
British essays
Essays about literature
Science fiction studies 
Tolkien studies
Works by Michael Moorcock